Bigtoe is a motorcycle that once held the Guinness World Record in the category of Tallest Rideable Motorcycle, bearing a maximum height of 7.5 feet (2.3 metres) and a top speed of 62 mph. It weighs 3,600 pounds. Tom Wiberg, from Sweden, built it in 1998 with a Jaguar V12 engine.

The title has passed to Dream Big, a bike built by Greg Dunham in 2005. Wiberg also holds the record for the smallest rideable motorcycle, with Smalltoe.

See also
 List of motorcycles by type of engine

References

External links
 BigToe homepage
 Big Toe

Custom motorcycles
Individual motorcycles